Klucze  is a village in Olkusz County, Lesser Poland Voivodeship, in southern Poland. It is the seat of the gmina (administrative district) called Gmina Klucze.

The village has a population of 5,926. Religions: Roman Catholicism (The Church).

References

Villages in Olkusz County